Vikramōrvaśīyam is a five-act Sanskrit play by ancient Indian poet Kālidāsa, who lived in the 4th or 5th Century CE, on the Vedic love story of King Pururavas and an Apsarā (celestial nymph) named Ūrvaśī, known for her beauty.

As per the tradition, while the basic plot has taken elements from the sources such as the Samvāda Sūkta of the Ṛgveda, Mahābhārata and others, Kālidāsa has made significant adaptations to make the presentation more appealing while establishing his prowess as a playwright.

Vikramorvaśīyam is the second of the three plays written by Kālidāsa, the first being Mālavikāgnimitram and the third being the celebrated Abhijñānaśākuntalam.

According to one theory, "Vikrama" in the title alludes to Kālidāsa's patron king Vikramāditya. However, there is no conclusive evidence for this, although both are said to have lived around the same time period. It simply means "Valour".

Origin of the plotPandya, S. M. & Shah, U. (1993). The Sources of the Play and the Changes Brought about by Kalidasa. (Ed.s) Chapter-3, Mahakakavikalidasavirachitam Vikramorvashiyam, Saraswati Pustak Bhandar, Ahmedabad. p. 25-29.
The classical theory of Sanskrit drama, known as Natyaśāstra makes it a rule that the plot of a Sanskrit drama 'must be famous'. Accordingly, authors of Sanskrit plays use the stories from Purāṇas, Vedic texts and classic epics, namely Mahābhārata and Rāmāyaṇa for developing plays. However, the core objective of a drama is entertainment. Since everyone is familiar with the basic plot, if the presentation of the play is not interesting or enchanting in some way, people would be bored. Hence there is emphasis on originality of the playwright. In the case of Vikramorvaśīyam, here is how Kālidāsa has adapted the original subject:

Ṛg-veda : In the 95th section, called Sūkta of the tenth cluster (called Maṇḍala), there is a dialogue between Pururava and Ūrvaśī. Situation suggests that she has left the king after living for four years with him. The king beseeches her to return, but she refuses (saying, "na vai straiṇāni santi śālavṛkānām hṛdayānyetāḥ" - meaning, the hearts of women are like those of jackals). The story ends at that.

Śatapatha Brāhmaṇa: Apparently aimed at emphasizing importance of a Yagya, Pururava was attracted to Ūrvaśī when she came to his city. She agreed with a condition, but when the king could not honor it because of manipulation by Gandharva people, she left him. Later, moved by the king's plight without her, she agreed to return once every year to him. The king still missed her a lot, so now convinced of his love, the Gandharvas asked him to perform a Yagya, due to which Pururava attained Gandharva-hood and could reunite with Urvashi (P. 1.2).

Purana: In all, Vishnu Purana (4.6, 34-39), Padma Purana (Sṛṣṭi Khaṇḍa 12, 62-68), Matsya Purana (24, 10-32), Mahabharata, Bhāgavata Purana (9, 14) and the story of Gunadhya in Brihatkatha are the sources of the story of Pururava and Urvashi. There are multiple versions of these stories in different sources, but one can see the following elements in this pool:

(a) That Urvashi descended from heaven for some reason and met Pururava;
(b) The two lived together under some condition(s) for some time;
(c) At least on one occasion Urvashi had to part from the king under some sort of breach, for which she changed form;
(d) Urvashi returned to her form and got reunited with the king, but there came a time when she had to return to the heaven to serve Indra (e) The two had a son together, named Ayuṣa.

Whether they lived together happily ever after is questionable, because there is one more story in Mahabharata in which Arjuna (a descendant of Pururava) goes to heaven and meets Urvashi there. Hence, by inference she and Pururava lived together during his lifetime, as he was a mortal.

Adaptations by Kalidasa
Adaptations by Kalidasa add novelty and surprise in the original subject, and infuse fresh depth and perspective. Here is how:

(1) Urvashi was banished from the heaven, but how she got that punishment is Kalidasa's own imagination. According to Vikramorvashiyam, she was playing the part of Lakshmi in a play directed by Bharata Muni, performed in the court of Indra. In the scene of Lakshmi Svayamvara, she was asked who she had given her heart to. Urvashi, smitten by Pururava at that time, could not distinguish between her role and her self, and ended up saying 'Pururava' instead of 'Purushottama'. This lack of mindfulness angered Bharata Muni, who cursed her to fall to earth. This curse, actually, was a boon for her. Indra, out of his appreciation for her, modified the curse by saying that she would return from earth when Pururava sees the face of their son.

(2) Some of the original versions suggest that Urvashi returned to heaven the moment her conditions were breached, without consideration for Pururava's repeated requests and his anguish at parting. However, Kalidasa adds the wonderful element of Sangamaniya gem for reuniting Urvashi and Pururava with their son Ayush, and then adds visit by Narada carrying the message from Indra that since Pururava is a valued friend of his, and in future wars with demons his support is going to be pivotal, Urvashi could stay with him until end of his days. This addition of Indra's gesture at once depicts Urvashi's hesitation and pain to leave, desire to stay, being bound by the curse - all being eased by Indra's favor.

(3) Forest of Kartikeya where women were banned: Again, the original story mentions that the two were sent apart due to a curse, but Kalidasa adds the imagination that when the two went to Mount Gandhamādana after their marriage, Pururava once stared at a young Gandharva girl named Udayavati, who was playing by the river. Enraged by jealousy or displeasure, Urvashi stormed out of that place - and went straight into a forest which was prohibited for women. Thus she turned into a vine. Pururava, moved to extreme sixth stage of being in love, tried to find her and this is an opportunity Kalidasa creates to add narration of Nature, and conversation of Pururava with various elements of Nature, flora and fauna. Description of Nature is Kalidasa's forte and the metaphors he uses to describe his beloved are wonderful.

(4) Urvashi's dilemma: Kalidasa adds complexity confronting the character of Urvashi by introducing the condition that when Pururava sees the face of their son, Urvashi will return to the heaven. In Vikramorvashiyam, Urvashi conceives and delivers the son quickly without the knowledge of Pururava who never saw her pregnant (explanation is that she is a celestial being, and they have different patterns of carrying children). Son is placed under the care of Chyavan Rishi, who makes sure that since he is a Kshatriya, he would be taught Dhanurveda along with other systems of knowledge, but he will abide by the rules of the Ashram. The day Ayush breaks the code of non-violence by hunting a bird who carried a red gem, is also the day when Pururava's cherished Sangamaniya Gem is picked up by a bird who believed it to be a piece of red meat. Someone brings to the king the dead bird with the gem and the arrow that hit the bird. Chyavana Rishi sends back Ayush to Pururava's court. King reads the inscription on the arrow, which says that it belonged to "Ayush, the son of Ila's son (implying Pururava) and Urvashi". Urvashi tells the whole story of curse to Pururava who is very happy that his bane of being childless is removed, who appoints Ayush as the Prince and is very unhappy that Urvashi would now have to leave. At that point Narada brings the happy tidings and the play ends.

Cast of characters

Prologue
Characters reciting the Benediction are:
Sutradhara - Director/producer and over-all manager of the theatre
Marisha - Sutradhara's assistant and he is probably in charge of the stage and the cast

Play
Major characters appearing in the play are:
Pururava - A king of the lunar dynasty, who rules Pratishthana Kingdom; the hero of the play
Urvashi - The foremost of the apsaras, the celestial dancers of the heaven; the heroine of the play 
Ayus - Son of Pururava and Urvashi, fostered in the hermitage of sage Chyavana 
Chitralekha - An apsara and Urvashi's close friend
Manavaka - A vidushaka (jester) and Pururava's close friend, who aids in his romantic pursuit
Aushinari - The princess of Kashi and the queen-consort of Pururava
Nipunika - The personal attendant of Aushinari, who informs the queen about Pururava's love for Urvashi 
Rambha, Menaka and Sahajanya - Three apsara companions of Urvashi, who report about her abduction to Pururavas
Narada - A divine-sage, who acts as emissary of Indra
Chitraratha - Chief of gandharvas, the heavenly musicians, and the messenger of the god Indra
Pallava and Galava - disciples of Bharata Muni
Satyavati - A disciple of Chyavana and the foster-mother of Ayus
Suta - Charioteer of Pururavas
Latavya - Chief officer of royal chambers of Aushinari
Kirati - A huntress dwelling in the mountains
Yavani - A Graeco-Bactrian bow-bearer
Characters with significant mentions in the play are:
Indra - The king of the gods and an ally of Pururava
Bharata Muni - The sage who curses Urvashi to descend on the Earth
Keshi - A danava (demon) monarch who abducts Urvashi
Brihaspati - the teacher of the gods
Kubera - God of riches
Kartikeya - The commander of the gods' army, and the protagonist of Kumarsambhavam, another work by Kalidasa
Udayavati - A gandharva girl to whom Pururava is temporary attracted 
Chyavana - the teacher of Ayus
Dikpalas - the divine guardians of the directions

Plot
Once upon a time, Urvashi, who was an Apsara, was returning to heaven from the palace of Kubera on mount Kailasa. She was with Chitralekha, Rambha and many others, but the demon named Keshin abducted Urvashi and Chitralekha and went in the North-East direction. The group of Apsaras started screaming for help, which was heard by the king Pururava, who rescued the two. Urvashi and Pururava fall in love at first sight. The nymphs were immediately summoned back to heaven. 
 
King tried to focus on his work, but he was unable to shake off the preoccupation with the thoughts of Urvashi. He wondered if his was a case of unrequited love, and consults his friend, Manavaka. Meanwhile, Aushinari, the wife of Pururava, gets suspicious after a love-sick Pururavas addresses her as "Urvashi". The queen's personal attendant Nipunika cleverly manages to get information about the source of Pururava's inanity and informs it to Aushinari. Urvashi, who had gone in invisible form to see the king, wrote a message on a birch leaf instantly, confirming her love.

Unfortunately, the leaf was carried off by the wind and stopped only at the feet of Aushinari. She was enraged at first, but later declared that she would not come in the way of lovers. Before Urvashi and Pururava could talk, Urvashi was summoned again to heaven to perform in a play. She was so smitten that she missed her cue and mispronounced her lover's name during the performance as Pururava instead of Purushottama. As a punishment, Urvashi was banished from heaven, which was modified by Indra as until the moment her human lover laid eyes on the child that she would bear him. After a series of mishaps, including Urvashi's temporary transformation into a vine, the curse was eventually lifted, and the lovers were allowed to remain together on Earth as long as Pururava lived.

Major Acts and episodes within each Act

Act-1:
Starting with Introduction or Prastāvanā 
(1) Pururava volunteers to rescue Urvashi
(2) Rescue of Urvashi
(3) Mount Hemakuta 
(4) Episode of single-stringed necklace

Act-2:
Starting with Prelude or Praveśaka
(1) Forest Pramada
(2) Entry of Urvashi
(3) Episode of Bhurja Patra

Act-3:
Starting with Interlude/Viṣkambhaka
(1) Enunch inviting Pururava to Maṇi Mahālaya
(2) waiting and conversation at Maṇi Mahālaya
(3) The ritual of taking a vow of pleasing the dear one - Priyānuprasādana Vrata by Aushinari accompanied by maids
(4) conversation involving Chitralekha, Pururava, Vidushaka/jester and Urvashi and her rendezvous with the king

Act-4:
Starting with Prelude or Praveshaka
(1) episode of Udayavati 
(2) extreme anguish of Pururava at loss of Urvashi
(3) episode of Sangamaniya gem
(4) return to the kingdom

Act-5:
Starting with Vidushaka announcement
(1) Bird taking the gem
(२) arrival of Ayush, about whom Pururava had no knowledge
(3) Revelation by Urvashi of her conditional release from the curse
(4) entry of Naarada (नारद)
(5) Happy ending

In popular culture
Kanjibhai Rathod directed Vikram Urvashi, a 1920 Indian silent film adaptation; this was followed by Vishnupant Divekar's Urvashi in 1921. In 1954, Madhu Bose made an Indian Bengali-language film adaptation titled Vikram Urvashi. Vikrama Urvashi is a 1940 Indian Tamil-language film directed by C. V. Raman based on the play. The story of a nymph marrying a noble-born human and leaving her celestial home has been used in 1957 Tamil film Manalane Mangayin Bhagyam.

See also
 Sanskrit literature
 Sanskrit drama
 List of Sanskrit plays in English translation

Notes

Further reading
 
 
 
 

Works by Kalidasa
Sanskrit plays
Indian plays adapted into films
Ancient Indian poems
Ancient indian Dramas